Spiced ale refers to traditional ales flavored with non-traditional spices and herbs. Spiced ales are sometimes brewed as a seasonal beer, such as during the time of Christmas or other holidays.

References

Types of beer